Bargain Hunt, formerly Essex Bargain Hunt, is an American discount store chain. Founded in 2004, Bargain Hunt is headquartered in La Vergne, Tennessee with retail locations in Tennessee, Ohio, Indiana, Kentucky, North Carolina, South Carolina, Georgia, Alabama, Mississippi and Arkansas.

History

Essex Technology Group — Bargain Hunt's parent company was founded in the year 2000 in Nashville by Robert Echols and Phil Pfeffer. They started the company as a wholesaler of closeout goods. The company bought overstock and excess inventory goods from big box retailers and sold them. Initially, the focus was on electronics and computers.

The first store was opened in 2004 in Nashville and was known as Essex Bargain Hunt. The company also began an online store selling directly to retail customers from its original Nashville location. The strategy was to sell items that were too big or expensive to sell online.

After a successful run, Essex launched the Bargain Hunt superstores using locations abandoned by stores such as Staples and Circuit City. The name was later changed to Bargain Hunt.

In 2020, the company won one of the Alliance Awards 2020.

Expansion

Bargain Hunt opened its first store in Nashville in the year 2004 and went on to expand in Southern and Midwest United States. The chain operates more than 80 stores in 10 states as of 2017. In 2015, Thomas H. Lee Partners acquired a majority stake in the retail chain.

Retail Format
Bargain Hunt stores are typically around 20,000 - 25,000 sq ft. in size and sell products such as electronics, movies and music, furniture, home improvement, clothing, footwear, jewelry, toys, health and beauty, pet supplies, sporting goods and fitness.

Sales Strategy

The stores sell name brands at a discount of 30% to 70% on regular prices and play in the extreme value retail space. The store also utilizes a discounting program that drops the prices on items by specific percentages depending on the time they have been on shelves. The company will eventually discount its merchandise on a 30, 60, and 90 day cycle (30 days gets 30% off, 60 days gets 60% off, etc.).

External links 
 Official website
 LinkedIn

References

Retail companies established in 2004
Discount stores of the United States
American companies established in 2004
2004 establishments in Tennessee
Companies based in Tennessee